Strictly Confidential is a 1959 British comedy film directed by Charles Saunders and starring Richard Murdoch, William Kendall, Maya Koumani and Neil Hallett. Two con-men, recently released from prison, are enlisted by a widow to help her recover control of her late husband's business which has been taken from her.

Premise
Released from prison, two genteel con-men, former Commander Binham-Ryley (Richard Murdoch) and former Major Rory McQuarry (William Kendall), target a beautiful and wealthy young widow (Maya Koumani) who hires them to run her factory. What the crooks fail to realise is that Maxine Millard has devious schemes of her own in mind.

Cast
 Richard Murdoch as Cmdr. Bissham-Ryley
 William Kendall as Major Rory McQuarry
 Maya Koumani as Maxine Millard
 Neil Hallett as Basil Wantage
 Bruce Seton as Inspector Shearing
 Ellis Irving as Captain Sharples
 Larry Burns as Barman
 Llewellyn Rees as Mellinger
 William Hartnell as Grimshaw

References

External links

1959 films
1959 comedy films
British comedy films
Films directed by Charles Saunders
Films scored by Malcolm Lockyer
Films shot at Twickenham Film Studios
1950s English-language films
1950s British films